Taste receptor, type 2, member 42 is a protein that in humans is encoded by the TAS2R42  gene.

References

Further reading

Human taste receptors